The men's 100 metres competition of the athletics events at the 2019 Pan American Games will take place between the 6 and 7 of August at the 2019 Pan American Games Athletics Stadium. The defending Pan American Games champion is Andre De Grasse from Canada.

Records
Prior to this competition, the existing world and Pan American Games records were as follows:

Schedule

Results
All times shown are in seconds.

Semifinal
Qualification: First 2 in each heat (Q) and next 2 fastest (q) qualified for the final. The results were as follows:  

Wind:Heat 1: +0.3 m/s, Heat 2: +0.3 m/s, Heat 3: -0.3 m/s

Final
The results were as follows:  

Wind: -0.5 m/s

References

Athletics at the 2019 Pan American Games
2019